

The John Leland Center for Theological Studies is a Baptist theological institute in Arlington, Virginia, with several satellite locations elsewhere in Virginia. Leland is partnered with the Baptist General Association of Virginia and the District of Columbia Baptist Convention, though the center has ties with a range of denominations and churches.  Leland is a member of the Washington Theological Consortium.

The center's namesake, John Leland, was an 18th- and 19th-century Baptist minister in the United States who was a proponent of the separation of church and state and an opponent of theological seminaries.

History
At a 1997 Baptist World Alliance meeting, several Baptist leaders discussed developing the Washington Metropolitan Area's first Baptist seminary.  These individuals resolved to create the center which began offering classes the next year.

Randel Everett, the center's first president, stepped down in late 2006. Mark J. Olson became Leland's second president in 2007. In 2019, William H. Smith became Leland's president.

Academics
The seminary is accredited by the Association of Theological Schools in the United States and Canada (ATS). The seminary offers the following ATS-approved degrees: Master of Divinity, Master of Christian Leadership, and Master of Theological Studies.  The seminary also offers several graduate certificates. 

Leland's School of Ministry offers the center's undergraduate-level courses, including a diploma in theology program. Students seeking a bachelor's degree may be able to transfer credit from the School of Ministry into two Bluefield College Bachelor of Arts degree programs.

References

External links

Education in Arlington County, Virginia
Baptist seminaries and theological colleges in the United States
Seminaries and theological colleges in Virginia
Educational institutions established in 1998
Buildings and structures in Arlington County, Virginia
Baptist Christianity in Virginia
1998 establishments in Virginia